is a Japanese, medal-winning Olympian, professional right-handed softball pitcher for Bic Camera Takasaki Bee Queen and the Japanese national team, who holds a bronze and two gold medals from the 2004, 2008 and 2020 Summer Olympics, respectively. She became the first pitcher ever to throw a perfect game at the Olympics, against China in Athens.  
With a fastball that tops out at 128 km/h (80 mph), she is widely recognized as the fastest pitcher in women's softball, although her signature pitch is her change-up, which is often cited as the best in the world.

Career

2006
In 2006, World Women's Softball Championship in Beijing, she shut out the U.S. team in the semifinal, but lost the final against the same U.S. team.

Perseverance at the 2008 Olympics
In the 2008 Summer Olympics, she again lost to the U.S. in the playoff allowing four runs in the tiebreak ninth inning, after shutting out the opponent until the previous inning. Yet, she won the final against the same U.S. by pitching her fifth complete game, allowing only one run in seven innings.

She threw over 600 pitches at the 2008 Beijing Summer Olympics in 4 days (413 in the last two days during which she completed three games, two of which went extra innings). During the semi-final and final games of the softball event, which lasted for two days and included three games, Ueno pitched 28 innings against the United States and Australia, considered the two best lineups in the world. NBC commentator Rob Baird described Ueno's feat as "one of the most amazing pitching performances in recent memory."

2020 Olympics
Ueno again joined Team Japan at the postponed 2020 Olympics in 2021. She went 2-0 for the team, allowing three earned runs, 13 hits, 6 walks and struck out 26 batters for a 0.95 ERA and 0.86 WHIP. She pitched 6 innings against the US in the gold medal game, along with teammate Miu Goto to shutout the Americans 2–0 on July 27, 2021. She became the first non-American pitcher to win and hold two gold medals in the Olympics for softball.

Popular culture
The pronunciation of Ueno's surname was brought to the attention of comedy duo Hamish & Andy during the Olympics. This was due to the name being very similar to a stereotypical Australian or Strine nickname for Wayne, 'Wayno'. It also is pronounced exactly the same way to national baseball pitcher, Wayne Ough. 
The segment was included on their compilation album Unessential Listening.

Notes

External links
 Beijing 2008 Athlete Biography: UENO Yukiko
  

1982 births
Living people
Japanese softball players
Olympic softball players of Japan
Softball players at the 2004 Summer Olympics
Softball players at the 2008 Summer Olympics
Softball players at the 2020 Summer Olympics
Olympic bronze medalists for Japan
Olympic gold medalists for Japan
Sportspeople from Fukuoka (city)
Olympic medalists in softball
Medalists at the 2008 Summer Olympics
Medalists at the 2004 Summer Olympics
Medalists at the 2020 Summer Olympics
Asian Games medalists in softball
Softball players at the 2002 Asian Games
Softball players at the 2006 Asian Games
Softball players at the 2010 Asian Games
Softball players at the 2014 Asian Games
Softball players at the 2018 Asian Games
Medalists at the 2002 Asian Games
Medalists at the 2006 Asian Games
Medalists at the 2010 Asian Games
Medalists at the 2014 Asian Games
Medalists at the 2018 Asian Games
Asian Games gold medalists for Japan
21st-century Japanese women